The men's 85 kilograms event at the 2014 World Weightlifting Championships was held on 12–13 November 2014 in Baluan Sholak Sports Palace, Almaty, Kazakhstan.

Schedule

Medalists

Records

 Andrei Rybakou's world record was rescinded in 2016.

Results

References

Results 

2014 World Weightlifting Championships